Tony Llewellyn-Jones is a British-born Australian actor. He was nominated for the 1976 AFI Award for Best Actor in a Supporting Role for his role in Picnic at Hanging Rock.
 
Born in London, England, Llewellyn-Jones lived in Singapore, Kuala Lumpur and Zimbabwe before moving to Australia in 1965. He is the son of Dr Derek Llewellyn-Jones and Elisabeth Kirkby. He has performed in films, such as Picnic at Hanging Rock, on TV, such as a long running role on G.P., and on stage, working with Melbourne Theatre Company, Sydney Theatre Company and Bell Shakespeare.

References

External links
 
 Biographical cuttings on Tony Llewellyn-Jones, actor, containing one or more cuttings from newspapers or journals at the National Library of Australia.
 

Australian male film actors
Australian male television actors
Australian male stage actors
Living people
Date of birth missing (living people)
1949 births